Typhoon Eli, known in the Philippines as Typhoon Konsing, struck the Philippines and Hainan during mid-July 1992. A weak low pressure system developed in the Philippine Sea on July 7, which became a tropical depression on the next day. The depression tracked west-northwest and strengthened into a tropical storm on July 10. After turning more westward, Eli steadily intensified, and obtained typhoon intensity that evening. The storm attained its highest intensity of  early on July 11 before striking northern Luzon. After entering the South China Sea, the storm maintained most of its intensity as it approached Hainan, although agencies disagree on how precisely strong it was. After passing through Hainan late on July 13, Eli passed through the Gulf of Tonkin on the next day before striking Vietnam, where Eli quickly dissipated.

Heavy rains associated with Typhoon Eli deluged Luzon and resulted in mudslides surrounding Mount Pinatubo, which had erupted a year prior. Offshore, 10 ships sunk, resulting in a fatality, 19 rescues, and initial reports of 25 missing fishermen. Monetary damage was estimated at US$862,000 (₱22 million). Fifteen homes were damaged and five were destroyed. A total of 1,027 families were evacuated from their homes. Throughout the country, four people were killed. Across Hong Kong, 23 people were injured. Farther south, Eli caused widespread damage in northern Hainan, though there were no deaths and only one serious injury. Around  of shrimp farms were flooded. Total economic loss in Hainan was estimated at US$272 million (¥1.5 billion).

Meteorological history

Following the recurvature of Tropical Depression Deanna on July 2, 1992, ridging temporarily replaced the monsoon trough across the Philippine Islands and the Philippine Sea. This prompted weak winds out of the southwest to persist at low latitudes, which eventually spawned a weak low pressure area that was first noted by the Joint Typhoon Warning Center (JTWC) on the morning of July 7. On the next day, the Japan Meteorological Agency (JMA) first classified the system as a tropical depression. After tracking to the south of Guam, the disturbance accelerated west-northwest and increased in organization, prompting JTWC to issue a Tropical Cyclone Formation Alert at 11:02 UTC on July 9. An increase in convective coverage then led the JTWC to declare the system a tropical depression seven hours later. The depression was upgraded to a tropical storm at 00:00 UTC on July 10 by both the JMA and JTWC as Eli's convective buildup continued.

The intensification trend persisted as the storm tracked more westward; the JMA declared Eli a severe tropical storm at 06:00 UTC the same day. Twelve hours later, the JTWC estimated at Eli attained typhoon intensity. At 00:00 UTC on July 11, the JMA upgraded Eli into a typhoon, with the JTWC and JMA also analyzing a peak intensity of  respectively at the same time. Shortly thereafter, the typhoon made landfall on northern Luzon. After entering the South China Sea, the typhoon tracked west as its forward motion slowed in response to Eli nearing the western end of a subtropical ridge. Now tracking west-northwest, data from the JTWC suggested that Eli maintained minimal typhoon intensity until it moved through Hainan on the night of July 13, though data from the JMA indicated that Eli was a weakening tropical storm during this time. The JTWC downgraded Eli into a tropical storm while the system moved west-northwestward across the Gulf of Tonkin. Eli dissipated over northern Vietnam on July 14.

Impact
The precursor disturbance to Eli dropped  of rain to Guam but there was no damage. Due to the impending threat of Eli, authorities raised typhoon alerts over wide areas of the southern Bicol region and across Luzon. Sixty buses in six town were set up in order to evacuate residents from vulnerable locations. Officials evacuated 1,600 people from their homes in three central Luzon towns to escape avalanches of debris from Mount Pinatubo.

Torrential rains associated with Typhoon Eli alleviated drought conditions but also resulted in mudslides in the Mount Pinatubo area of Luzon, where there were reports of three deaths, including a 72-year-old man who died of a heart attack while being evacuated in Minalin. Offshore, 10 ships sunk, resulting in a fatality, 19 rescues, and initial reports of 25 missing fishermen. Monetary damage was estimated at US$862,000 (₱22 million), with around half from crops, and half from infrastructure. Fifteen homes were damaged and five were destroyed. A total of 1,027 families were evacuated from their homes. Throughout the country, four people were killed.

The typhoon posed enough of a threat to Hong Kong to warrant a No 1. hurricane signal on July 11, and this signal was upgraded to a No. 3 a day later before Eli moved away. In Hong Kong one worker was injured when he was working on a boat in rough seas off Tsing Yi. Twenty-two passengers were hurt, including fourteen in Tuen Mun. Ferry services to China and Macau from Hong Kong were cancelled or suspended. Elsewhere, Eli caused widespread damage in northern Hainan, though there were no deaths. A farmer broke his legs in Wenchang due to a fallen coconut tree. Around  of shrimp farms were submerged. According to news reports, some houses collapsed and electricity cables were damaged while fish ponds were inundated. Total economic loss in Hainan was estimated at US$272 million (¥1.5 billion).

See also

Typhoon Kim (1980)

Notes

References

External links

E
E
E
E
E
E